An ectopic hormone is a hormone produced by tumors derived from tissue that is not typically associated with its production.

On the other hand, the term entopic is used to refer to hormones produced by  tissue in tumors that are normally engaged in the production of that hormone.

The excess hormone secretion is considered detrimental to the normal body homeostasis. This hormone production typically results in a set of signs and symptoms that are called a paraneoplastic syndrome.

Some clinical syndromes caused by ectopic hormone production include:

References 

Physiology
Endocrinology
Cell signaling